Ben Azubel (born 19 September 1993) is an Israeli professional footballer who plays as a forward for  Thai League 1 club BG Pathum United. He has previously played for Israeli clubs Hapoel Kfar Saba, Hakoah Amidar Ramat Gan, Hapoel Nir Ramat HaSharon, Hapoel Petah Tikva, Hapoel Ashkelon, Hapoel Acre, Hapoel Haifa, Bnei Yehuda Tel Aviv, Maccabi Netanya, and Hapoel Ra'anana, Albanian club Partizani Tirana, and Australian club Perth Glory.

Club career

Early years
Azubel started his football career with the Israeli youth teams of Maccabi Petah Tikva, Maccabi Tel Aviv, Maccabi Haifa, and Hapoel Kfar Saba.

Hapoel Kfar Saba
In September 2011, Azubel was promoted to the senior team of Hapoel Kfar Saba and played two years at the club.

Hakoah Amidar Ramat Gan
During the 2013–14 Liga Leumit season, Azubel scored 14 goals for Hakoah Amidar Ramat Gan.

Hapoel Nir Ramat HaSharon
Azubel joined Hapoel Nir Ramat HaSharon ahead of the 2014–15 Liga Leumit season. During the season, he scored eight goals, one of them being scored against his former club Hapoel Kfar Saba which he celebrated by pretending to fire guns, later saying that the fans insulted and his family. In May 2015, Azubel attracted interest from Israel Premier League giants Beitar Jerusalem.

Hapoel Petah Tikva
In July 2015, Azubel joined Hapoel Petah Tikva after their relegation to the Liga Leumit, signing a one-year contract with an option for an extra year. He was a notable player of the club, scoring 15 times in 36 games during the 2015–16 Liga Leumit season.

Partizani Tirana
After trialling with Beitar Jerusalem, including making an appearance in the 2016–17 Toto Cup Al, Azubel went overseas and became the first Israeli player to join an Albanian club when he signed with Partizani Tirana. He played seven league games for the club in which he scored one goal, and scored 4 goals in 4 cup games.

Hapoel Ashkelon
After scoring 37 goals in 3 Liga Leumit seasons, and following a stint overseas in Albania, Azubel returned to Israel and signed with Israel Premier League club Hapoel Ashkelon in December 2016.

Hapoel Acre
Following an unsuccessful season with Hapoel Ashkelon, in summer 2017, Azubel signed with Hapoel Acre on a three-year contract. He finished the 2017–18 Israeli Premier League season with eight goals, but could not prevent the club's relegation.

Loan to Hapoel Haifa
In August 2018, Azubel was courted by Maccabi Petah Tikva, but in the end joined Hapoel Haifa on a loan contract containing a buying option at the end of the season worth 600,000 shekel. At the end of the season, Hapoel Haifa decided not to buy Azubel, but he continued training with them which angered his parent club Hapoel Acre due to them not giving him permission to do so.

Bnei Yehuda Tel Aviv
In August 2019, Azubel joined Bnei Yehuda Tel Aviv on a two-year deal.

Maccabi Netanya
In October 2020, after impressing at training, Azubel joined Maccabi Netanya on a one-year contract with an extra three-year option. During the 2020–21 Israeli Premier League, he made 17 appearances, scoring only one goal.

Hapoel Ra'anana
In July 2021, Azubel joined Liga Leumit club Hapoel Ra'anana, together with defender Liad Elmaliach. During the 2021–22 Liga Leumit season, he scored 16 goals in 31 appearances and finished third top goalscorer of the competition. Despite this, the club finished the regular season in 15th place and were later relegated to Liga Alef. Following the season, Hapoel Ra'anana signed Azubel on a contract extension.

Perth Glory
Despite being contracted at Hapoel Ra'anana, in July 2022, Azubel went overseas a second time and signed a two-year contract with Australian A-League Men club Perth Glory.

BG Pathum United
Azubel left Perth Glory after making just 6 appearances for the club and signed for Thai club BG Pathum United.

International career
In November 2011, Azubel debuted for the Israel national under-19 team, playing all three games of their 2012 UEFA European Championship first qualifying phase against Czech Republic, Serbia, and Lithuania and scoring in the victory against Czech Republic. In February 2012, he played and scored in a 1–1 friendly match draw with Italy at Acre Municipal Stadium. A few months later, he played in a pair of friendly match losses to Romania before playing in all three matches of Israel's 2012 UEFA European Championship second qualifying phase against Ukraine, Portugal, and Ireland.

Personal life
Azubel was born in the Israeli town Ganei Tikva.

References

1993 births
Living people
Israeli Jews
Jewish footballers
Israeli footballers
Association football forwards
Hapoel Kfar Saba F.C. players
Hakoah Maccabi Amidar Ramat Gan F.C. players
Hapoel Nir Ramat HaSharon F.C. players
Hapoel Petah Tikva F.C. players
FK Partizani Tirana players
Hapoel Ashkelon F.C. players
Hapoel Acre F.C. players
Hapoel Haifa F.C. players
Bnei Yehuda Tel Aviv F.C. players
Maccabi Netanya F.C. players
Hapoel Ra'anana A.F.C. players
Perth Glory FC players
Ben Azubel
Israeli Premier League players
Liga Leumit players
Kategoria Superiore players
A-League Men players
Israeli expatriate footballers
Expatriate footballers in Albania
Israeli expatriate sportspeople in Albania
Expatriate soccer players in Australia
Israeli expatriate sportspeople in Australia